Tim Burton (born August 25, 1958) is an American filmmaker, animator, and artist, who often works with certain actors and crew members in multiple feature film directing projects.

Film composer Danny Elfman composed the music for most of Burton's feature films, save for Ed Wood (1994), Sweeney Todd: The Demon Barber of Fleet Street (2007), and Miss Peregrine's Home for Peculiar Children (2016). He also composed the music for The Nightmare Before Christmas (1993), a stop-motion animated film Burton co-wrote and produced.

The actors who collaborated with Burton the most frequently are Johnny Depp (8 films), Helena Bonham Carter (7 films), and Christopher Lee and Michael Gough (5 films each). Other actors that Burton has worked with repeatedly include Alan Arkin, Danny DeVito, Conchata Ferrell, Albert Finney, Carmen Filpi, Eva Green, Pat Hingle, Jan Hooks, Rance Howard, Jeffrey Jones, O-Lan Jones, Michael Keaton, Martin Landau, Lisa Marie, Jack Nicholson, Catherine O'Hara, Michelle Pfeiffer, Missi Pyle, Paul Reubens, Alan Rickman, Deep Roy, Winona Ryder, Diane Salinger, Glenn Shadix, Martin Short, Timothy Spall,  Terence Stamp, Sylvia Sidney, Christopher Walken, Frank Welker, and Paul Whitehouse.

Actor Jason Hervey appeared in the short film Frankenweenie (1984), before appearing in Burton's feature film-directing debut Pee-wee's Big Adventure (1985). Actor Vincent Price worked with Burton on three projects, hosting the television film Hansel and Gretel (1983), narrating the short film Vincent (1982) and appearing in the feature film Edward Scissorhands (1990). Twin actresses Ada and Arlene Tai worked with Burton as uncredited extras in Ed Wood before being cast as the conjoined twins Ping and Jing in Big Fish (2003). In addition to starring in Beetlejuice, Edward Scissorhands, and Frankenweenie (2012), Winona Ryder appeared in the Burton-directed music video for The Killers' 2012 single "Here with Me".

Christina Ricci marked the first performer to reunite with Burton for television, starring in Wednesday (2022) after appearing in Sleepy Hollow (1999).

Cast

Crew 
Burton also often works with certain crew members in multiple directing projects. This includes screenwriters Warren Skaaren, Caroline Thompson, John August, Scott Alexander, and Larry Karaszewski, producers Denise Di Novi, Allison Abbate, Richard D. Zanuck, and Derek Frey, composer Danny Elfman, composer/music supervisor/music producer/music editor Mike Higham, costume designer Colleen Atwood, production designers Bo Welch, Alex McDowell, and Rick Heinrichs, cinematographers Stefan Czapsky, Philippe Rousselot, Dariusz Wolski, and Bruno Delbonnel, makeup artists Ve Neill, Stan Winston, and Rick Baker, and editor/executive producer Chris Lebenzon. Burton has worked with director Henry Selick on The Nightmare Before Christmas (1993) and James and the Giant Peach (1996), the former of which Burton co-wrote. He has also worked with fellow producer/director Timur Bekmambetov and producer Jim Lemley on 9 (2009) and Abraham Lincoln: Vampire Hunter (2012), for which Bekmambetov also served as director. Burton has also collaborated with puppet manufacturers Mackinnon & Saunders three times: a failed attempt on Mars Attacks!, Corpse Bride, and Frankenweenie.

References

Lists of entertainers
Collaborators
Burton